"Suicide Is Painless" (or "Song from M*A*S*H") is a song written by Johnny Mandel (music) and Michael Altman (lyrics) for the 1970 film M*A*S*H. In addition to being performed by characters in the film, it plays during the title sequence as sung by The Ron Hicklin Singers. An instrumental version is likewise the theme music for the TV series based on the film, playing over the opening and closing credits.

Background 
The song was written for Ken Prymus, the actor playing Private Seidman, to sing during the faux-suicide of Walter "Painless Pole" Waldowski (John Schuck) in the film's "Last Supper" scene. Director Robert Altman had two stipulations about the song for composer Johnny Mandel: it had to be called "Suicide Is Painless" and it had to be the "stupidest song ever written". Altman attempted to write the lyric himself, but, upon finding it too difficult for his "45-year-old brain" to write something "stupid" enough, he gave the task to his 15-year-old-son Michael, who reportedly wrote the lyrics in five minutes.

Altman later decided that the song worked so well he would use it as the film's main theme. This more choral version was sung by uncredited session singers John Bahler, Tom Bahler, Ron Hicklin, and Ian Freebairn-Smith, and was released as a single attributed to "The Mash". Altman said that, while he only made $70,000 for directing the movie, his son had earned more than $1 million for co-writing the song.

Several instrumental versions of the song were used as the theme for the TV series, but the lyrics were never used in the show. It became a number-one hit in the UK Singles Chart in May 1980. The song was ranked No. 66 on AFI's 100 Years...100 Songs.

Track listing 
7″ vinyl
 West Germany: CBS / 5009
UK: CBS / S CBS  8536
US: Columbia / 4M-45130 [mono promo only]
US: Columbia / 4S-45130 [original stereo stock release]

Chart performance

Manic Street Preachers version

Welsh alternative rock band Manic Street Preachers released a cover version of "Suicide Is Painless" on September 7, 1992, as "Theme from M.A.S.H. (Suicide Is Painless)". In the UK, it was a double A-side charity single to help The Spastics Society, with the Fatima Mansions' take on Bryan Adams' "(Everything I Do) I Do It for You" as the other A-side. The 12-inch and CD versions of the UK single included "Sleeping with the NME" – an excerpt from a radio documentary recorded in the offices of the NME capturing staff's reaction to photographs of guitarist Richey Edwards' infamous self-mutilation. The single peaked at number seven on the UK Singles Chart spending three weeks in the top 10.

Track listings
7-inch vinyl
 UK: Columbia / 658382 7

 Netherlands: Columbia / COL 658385 7

12-inch vinyl
 UK: Columbia / 658382 6

CD
 UK: Columbia / 658382 2

 Europe: Columbia / 658385 2

 Japan: Epic/Sony / ESCA 5668

Charts

Weekly charts

Year-end charts

Cover recorded versions 
Ahmad Jamal recorded a new version of the song that replaced the version by The MASH on pressings of the soundtrack album beginning in 1973; the film retained the original version.
Bill Evans included an instrumental jazz cover on his posthumous 1980 album You Must Believe in Spring.
Al De Lory recorded "Song from M*A*S*H", an instrumental jazz piano version for his 1970 album Al De Lory Plays Song from M*A*S*H. This version peaked at No. 7 on the adult contemporary chart during the summer of 1970.
Swedish group Small Town Singers released a version under the title "Song from M*A*S*H" in 1975. The single peaked at 17th position in Sweden, Top 100 chart in Australia.
Marilyn Manson recorded a cover version which was released on the soundtrack to Book of Shadows: Blair Witch 2 in 2000

References

1970 singles
1970 songs
1980 singles
American folk songs
American soft rock songs
British soft rock songs
CBS Records singles
Charity singles
Columbia Records singles
Irish Singles Chart number-one singles
M*A*S*H
Manic Street Preachers songs
Marilyn Manson (band) songs
Songs about suicide
Songs about the military
Songs with music by Johnny Mandel
Songs written for films
Comedy television theme songs
UK Singles Chart number-one singles